The Islamic Action Front ( Jabhat al-'Amal al-Islami, IAF) is an Islamist political party in Jordan. It is the political wing of the Muslim Brotherhood in Jordan.

Founded in 1992 with 350 members, Engineer Ahmed Azaida, Dr. Ishaq Al-Farhan and Dr. Abdul Latif Arabiyat were the main force behind the formation.

Sheikh Hamza Mansour is the chief of the IAF and has declared the organization's intentions as wanting "to be treated as free men" and as wanting "relations with the US based on mutual respect", while questioning US Administration's motives in the Middle-East and around the World.

History

The IAF's support base is composed largely of Jordanians of Palestinian descent, and represents one of the major opposition movements in the country. It is known for its role in anti-corruption protests, as well as its role in the country's liberalization phase of the 1990s. The IAF has also taken an oppositional role towards Jordanian-Israeli relations. 
In 1997, three years after Jordan's peace accord with Israel, IAF boycotted Parliamentary elections, citing manipulation by the government.

At the legislative elections, 17 June 2003, the party won 20 out of 84 seats. All other seats were won by non-partisans. The National Democratic Block did not win any seats.

During the August 2007 municipal elections, IAF withdrew their 25 candidates up for election, accusing 'the authorities of manipulating votes cast by military personnel who were taking part in municipal elections for the first time.

The voter turnout for the election was a record-low 51%, but IAF still won four contests, including two mayoral races.

Four months later, the IAF fielded 22 candidates for the Jordanian national elections held on November 20, 2007.  Of its 22 candidates, only six won parliamentary seats in the elections, marking the lowest showing of the Islamist party since the resumption of parliamentary life in Jordan in 1989.

The IAF attributed its loss to the government overlooking illegal practices such as vote buying, the transfer of large numbers of votes, and inserting large numbers of voting cards in ballot boxes Nevertheless, a few days after the election, the Muslim Brotherhood (the social organization that informs the IAF’s platform and whose political branch the IAF is considered to be) dissolved its Shura Council and started preparing for internal elections to take place within six months.

In 2009, the deputy secretary of the party declared that the Pope was not welcome in the kingdom after plans were announced for Pope Benedict XVI to visit the country.

In 2012, Rohile Gharaibeh, a former senior IAF official, established the Zamzam Initiative, an organization with the stated goal of ending the Brotherhood's "monopoly on Islamic discourse" and promoting a more inclusive, indigenous Islam that does not "alienate the public." However, the Brotherhood's Shura Council responded by prohibiting members from interacting with the new group."

In 2015, the IAF was split between reformists and nonreformists, resulting in the party terminating the membership of seven members: Abdul Majeed Thneibat, Qassem Taamneh, Mamdouh Muheisen, Khalil Askar, Ali Tarawneh, Jaber Abul Hija and Mohammad Qaramseh. As a result, they formed the new Muslim Brotherhood Society, who will join the National Initiative for Building.

In December 2015, around 400 members resigned from the IAF, including Hamzeh Mansour, a former Secretary-General of the organisation.

Ideology

The Islamic Action Front is somewhat less radical than Islamist parties in some other countries since 2015. However, they do support violence against the Israeli state and citizens, they have praised those who have killed Israeli soldiers and citizens, and do not support LGBTQ equality, they have actively sought to ban homosexual performers from coming to the country. The IAF's support base is primarily Palestinians residing in Jordan. Most members of IAF are of Palestinian origin. The IAF act as the conservative element in Jordan's Parliament, representing the traditional segment of society.
 
Ibrahim Zeid Keilani, a former Minister of Awqaf and Islamic Affairs, served for a long time as the head of the Sharia Ulema Committee of the party.

Within the IAF Abu Zant called himself the leader of the most radical section of the party. He had a sizeable group of followers.

Electoral results

Jordanian Parliament

See also
 List of political parties in Jordan

References

External links
Website

Jordanian democracy movements
1992 establishments in Jordan
Islamic political parties
Muslim Brotherhood
Political parties established in 1992
Political parties in Jordan